Orites fiebrigii is a species of flowering plant in the protea family that is endemic to Bolivia.

References

 

 
fiebrigii
Endemic flora of Bolivia
Plants described in 1911